Dazaranha (also known simply as Daza) is a Brazilian rock band, formed in Florianópolis in the early 1990s. Its members are Adauto (bass), Chico Martins (lead guitar and vocals), Fernando (violin and backing vocalist), Gazu (lead vocals), Gerry (percussion), Moriel (rhythm guitar and backing vocalist). The band combined reggae and rock, with strong participation arrangements violin.

It's considered the band with higher expression in the music scene in Santa Catarina.

Discography

Singles

Videography 
 Dazaranha Ao Vivo (2010) – live show recorded at the CIC (Integrated Culture Center), in Florianópolis.

Awards 
 2006: Claro Independent Music Award – The Best Pop Album

Members

Time line

Forming

Past members 
Adriano – Drums
Gazu – Vocals and Guitar
Zé Caetano – Drums

Support band 
João Basañez – Drums
Trio Santo Amaro
Leandro – Saxophone
Paulinho – Trumpet
Hemerson – Trombone

Trio Santo Amaro 
In 2007, during the production and recording of Paralisa album, the Dazaranha modernize and innovate the already established band style by showing in his songs the strong brass instrument presence of Trio Santo Amaro, who has since joined the band.

The Trio Santo Amaro received this nomenclature from members of Dazaranha because the musicians living in Santo Amaro da Imperatriz and they are formed musically in the Musical Society and Cultural Santo Amaro.

References

External links 
  
 Dicionário Cravo Albin da Música Popular Brasileira 

Musical groups established in 1992
1992 establishments in Brazil
Brazilian rock music groups
Musicians from Florianópolis